A race-conscious policy is a policy that aims to improve the conditions of racial minorities. In the United States, such policies are typically aimed at improving the status of African-Americans. Many different kinds of race-conscious policies exist, ranging from nondiscrimination policy to strict numerical racial quotas. Their main purpose is twofold: to compensate for past discrimination against the target race, and to increase equality of opportunity.

Education
In the United States, race-conscious policies like desegregation busing have long been used to counteract school segregation. The Supreme Court of the United States ruled in favor of these measures more in the 1960s and the 1970s than it has since then.

International variations
France, unlike many other Western European countries (including Britain), has avoided adopting race-conscious policies. Variations in these policies between Britain and France are in large part due to the different frames through which the policies were portrayed in the two countries.

Public opinion
Whites are the least supportive of race-conscious policies, while African Americans are the most supportive of them. Latinos and Asian Americans take intermediate stances in their opinions of these policies. This pattern persists after controlling for measures of racial prejudice, class status, and other factors. Among white liberals, racial resentment predicts support for race-conscious programs only for black students. In contrast, among white conservatives, racial resentment is closely related to opposition to such programs regardless of the recipient's race.

See also
 Color consciousness

References

Race and law
Racism
Politics and race
Social policy